Semi-automatic command to line of sight (SACLOS) is a method of missile command guidance. In SACLOS, the operator must continually point a sighting device at the target while the missile is in flight. Electronics in the sighting device and/or the missile then guide it to the target.

Many SACLOS weapons are based on an infrared seeker aligned with the operator's gunsight or sighting telescope. The seeker tracks the missile, either the hot exhaust from its rocket motor or flares attached to the missile airframe, and measures the angle between the missile and the centerline of the operator's sights. This signal is sent to the missile, often using thin metal wires or a radio link, which causes it to steer back toward the center of the line-of-sight. Common examples of these weapons include the BGM-71 TOW wire-guided anti-tank guided missile (ATGM) and the Rapier radio-command surface-to-air missile (SAM).

Another class of SACLOS weapons is based on the beam riding principle. In this case, a signal is sent from the operator's sights toward the target. The signal is generally radio or a laser. The missile has receivers for the signal on the rear of the fuselage. Some form of encoding is used in the signal so that the missile can steer itself into the center of the beam. Changing frequencies or dot patterns are also commonly used. These systems have the advantage that the link between the launcher and missile cannot easily be broken or jammed. But, they have a disadvantage because the guidance signal may be detected by the target. Examples include the laser-guided RBS 70 SAM and 9M119 Svir ATGM.

Wire and radio-guided SACLOS 
With wire- and radio-guided SACLOS, the sighting device can calculate the angular difference in direction from the missile position to the target location. It can then give electronic instructions to the missile that correct its flight path so it is flying along a straight line from the sighting device to the target.  Most antitank SACLOS systems such as Milan and TOW use a strobe or flare (visible, infrared (IR) or ultraviolet (UV) light) in the tail of the missile with an appropriate sensor on the firing post, to track the missile's flight path.  The launching station incorporates a tracking camera with two lenses.  A wide field of view lens that locates and "gathers" the missile near the center of the gunners line of sight immediately after launch, and a narrow view lens with automatic zoom that accomplishes the fine tracking adjustments.  In most configurations, the narrow field camera utilizes electronics that translate the brightest spot in the view – the flare or strobe of the missile – into an electrical impulse.  This impulse changes as the missile leaves the center of the field of view, and the electronics automatically apply a correction instruction in the opposite direction of the change to re-center the missile.

These instructions are delivered either by a radio link or a wire.  Radio links have the disadvantage of being jammable, whereas wire links have the disadvantages of being limited to the length of the wire and fragile (i.e. not very good for penetrating/attacking targets in vegetated areas such as forests) and can not be fired over bodies of water due to potential shorting of the wires. Also, wires leave a trace all the way to the target, which could help find the source of the fire.

Examples
 Wire-guided: HOT, MILAN, Swingfire, AT-4 Spigot, AT-5 Spandrel, M47 Dragon, AT-7 Saxhorn, BGM-71 TOW, Bumbar, Baktar-Shikan
 Radio-guided: ASM-N-2 Bat, 9K33 'Osa' (SA-8 'Gecko'), Javelin surface to air missile

Beam-riding SACLOS 
With beam-riding SACLOS, the sighting device emits a directional signal directed toward the target. A detector in the tail of the missile looks for the signal. Electronics in the missile then keep it centered in the beam.

It differs from semi-active radar homing (SARH) and semi-active laser homing (SALH) in which the target is illuminated by a powerful emitter, and a sensor in the head of missile detects the reflected emissions and directs it to the target.

Radar was the most common form of SACLOS signals in early systems, because, in the anti-aircraft role, the target is typically already being illuminated by a radar signal. However, a beam-riding missile flies directly at the target, which is often inefficient for a high-speed target like an aircraft. For this reason, most anti-aircraft missiles follow their own route to intercept the target, and do not ride the beam. A more modern use of beam-riding uses laser signals because they are compact, less sensitive to distance, and are difficult to detect and jam.

This was also one of the main advantages over concurrent SALH systems regarding detection: a laser riding beam emitter is typically a low powered device and does not need to be pointed immediately to the target. Because the missile sensor looks backward to it, the whole system is also impervious to most jamming devices. Another advantage in antitank applications is that the backward-looking guidance system does not interfere with the process of jet formation of high-explosive anti-tank (HEAT) charges, thus maximizing weapon's effectiveness. 

However, such systems don't allow for a top-attack mode, or target illumination from a different source than the launcher itself, so choice between the two operating modes may vary between operators.  

The main disadvantage of both SACLOS guidance systems in an anti-tank role is that working on angular differences evaluation, it does not allow any notable separation between guidance system and missile launch post the opposite of manual command to line of sight (MCLOS) ones, thus allowing updated version of such anti-tank weapons (notably AT-3 Malyutka) to still remain in service in some countries.

Examples
 9M133 Kornet
 9M119 Svir
 HJ-9
 MSS-1.2
 RBS-70
 Shershen
 Starstreak
 ZT3 Ingwe

References

See also
 Command guidance
 Manual command to line of sight (MCLOS)
 Fire-and-forget

 

Missile guidance